Lexington is a former settlement in Edwards County, Illinois, United States.

References

Geography of Edwards County, Illinois
Ghost towns in Illinois